Umm Dam is a town in North Kurdufan State in central Sudan 60 kilometres north east of El Obeid.
It lies about halfway between Surur to the northwest and Habila to the southeast.

Populated places in North Kurdufan